Ring finger protein 26 is a protein that in humans is encoded by the RNF26 gene.

Function 

The protein encoded by this intronless gene contains a C3HC5 type of RING finger, a motif known to be involved in protein-DNA and protein-protein interactions. The expression of this gene was found to be upregulated in cancer cell lines derived from different types of cancer. [provided by RefSeq, Jul 2008].

References

Further reading 

 

RING finger proteins